Georgi Kurtev (born 23 October 1986) is a Bulgarian footballer, currently playing as a forward for Eurocollege.

References

1986 births
Living people
Bulgarian footballers
First Professional Football League (Bulgaria) players
PFC Rodopa Smolyan players
Botev Plovdiv players
FC Haskovo players
FC Chernomorets Balchik players
Association football forwards